Naslen K. Gafoor (born 11 June 2000) is an Indian actor who appears in the Malayalam Cinema.He is best known for portraying Melvin in Thanneer Mathan Dinangal (2019) and Charles Oliver Twist in Home (2021).

Career 
In 2019, Naslen did an uncredited role in the film Madhura Raja. He played the character of Melvin in the movie Thanneer Mathan Dinangal. He was praised for the timely comedies and witty counter dialogues in that film. In 2021, Naslen played Rasool, a fiery teenager in the film Kuruthi which was released in Amazon Prime. In the same year he did the role of Charles Oliver Twist in the film Home which was also released in Amazon Prime. He then appeared in the comedy movie, Keshu Ee Veedinte Nadhan which was released in Disney+ Hotstar. Anna Mathews of Times Of India wrote about his performance in the film that, "The young actor Naslen, as usual, even in a small role, he manages to stand out and be goofily loveable."

Filmography

Films

References

External links 

Living people
Male actors from Kerala
21st-century Indian male actors
Indian male film actors
Male actors in Malayalam cinema
Male actors from Thrissur
2000 births